Barbara Perry may refer to:

 Barbara Perry (actress) (1921–2019), American actress
 Barbara Perry (politician) (born 1964), Australian politician
 Barbara A. Perry, American academic
 Barbara Perry (volleyball) (born 1945), played for the U.S. national team